Koji Takeuchi (born May 29, 1974) is a Japanese mixed martial artist. He competed in the Welterweight division.

Mixed martial arts record

|-
| Win
| align=center| 7-8-5
| Hiroshi Kozakai
| Submission (rear-naked choke)
| Pancrase: Sapporo
| 
| align=center| 1
| align=center| 1:24
| Sapporo, Hokkaido, Japan
| 
|-
| Win
| align=center| 6-8-5
| Hyung-Seok Lee
| Submission (guillotine choke)
| PRO Fighting: PRO FC 9
| 
| align=center| 2
| align=center| 2:06
| Taipei, Taiwan
| 
|-
| Win
| align=center| 5-8-5
| Hidekazu Asakura
| Decision (unanimous)
| Bout: Bout 15
| 
| align=center| 2
| align=center| 5:00
| Hakodate, Hokkaido, Japan
| 
|-
| Win
| align=center| 4-8-5
| Hidekazu Asakura
| Decision (majority)
| BM 6: Battle Mix 6
| 
| align=center| 2
| align=center| 5:00
| Sapporo, Hokkaido, Japan
| 
|-
| Loss
| align=center| 3-8-5
| Kabuto Kokage
| Decision (unanimous)
| Shooto 2005: 7/30 in Korakuen Hall
| 
| align=center| 2
| align=center| 5:00
| Tokyo, Japan
| 
|-
| Loss
| align=center| 3-7-5
| Komei Okada
| Decision (unanimous)
| Shooto: 9/26 in Kourakuen Hall
| 
| align=center| 2
| align=center| 5:00
| Tokyo, Japan
| 
|-
| Win
| align=center| 3-6-5
| Wataru Miki
| Submission (armbar)
| Shooto 2004: 4/16 in Kitazawa Town Hall
| 
| align=center| 1
| align=center| 4:11
| Setagaya, Tokyo, Japan
| 
|-
| Loss
| align=center| 2-6-5
| Ganjo Tentsuku
| Decision (unanimous)
| Shooto: Who is Young Leader!
| 
| align=center| 2
| align=center| 5:00
| Tokyo, Japan
| 
|-
| Draw
| align=center| 2-5-5
| Tashiro Nishiuchi
| Draw
| Deep: 8th Impact
| 
| align=center| 3
| align=center| 5:00
| Tokyo, Japan
| 
|-
| Loss
| align=center| 2-5-4
| Masato Fujiwara
| Decision (unanimous)
| Shooto: To The Top 10
| 
| align=center| 2
| align=center| 5:00
| Tokyo, Japan
| 
|-
| Loss
| align=center| 2-4-4
| Hiroshi Tsuruya
| Decision (unanimous)
| Shooto: To The Top 9
| 
| align=center| 2
| align=center| 5:00
| Tokyo, Japan
| 
|-
| Loss
| align=center| 2-3-4
| Takeshi Yamazaki
| Decision (majority)
| Shooto: To The Top 5
| 
| align=center| 2
| align=center| 5:00
| Setagaya, Tokyo, Japan
| 
|-
| Draw
| align=center| 2-2-4
| Hideki Kadowaki
| Draw
| Shooto: To The Top 2
| 
| align=center| 2
| align=center| 5:00
| Tokyo, Japan
| 
|-
| Draw
| align=center| 2-2-3
| Takaharu Murahama
| Draw
| Shooto: R.E.A.D. 12
| 
| align=center| 2
| align=center| 5:00
| Tokyo, Japan
| 
|-
| Draw
| align=center| 2-2-2
| Takumi Nakayama
| Draw
| Shooto: R.E.A.D. 6
| 
| align=center| 2
| align=center| 5:00
| Tokyo, Japan
| 
|-
| Win
| align=center| 2-2-1
| Makoto Ishikawa
| Decision (majority)
| Shooto: R.E.A.D. 5
| 
| align=center| 2
| align=center| 5:00
| Tokyo, Japan
| 
|-
| Draw
| align=center| 1-2-1
| Tetsuharu Ikei
| Draw
| Shooto: Shooter's Ambition
| 
| align=center| 2
| align=center| 5:00
| Setagaya, Tokyo, Japan
| 
|-
| Win
| align=center| 1-2
| Mitsuo Matsumoto
| Submission (triangle choke)
| Shooto: Shooter's Passion
| 
| align=center| 2
| align=center| 1:30
| Setagaya, Tokyo, Japan
| 
|-
| Loss
| align=center| 0-2
| Kazuya Abe
| Decision (unanimous)
| Shooto: Renaxis 1
| 
| align=center| 2
| align=center| 5:00
| Tokyo, Japan
| 
|-
| Loss
| align=center| 0-1
| Kohei Yasumi
| Decision (unanimous)
| Shooto: Shooter's Soul
| 
| align=center| 2
| align=center| 5:00
| Setagaya, Tokyo, Japan
|

See also
List of male mixed martial artists

References

1974 births
Japanese male mixed martial artists
Welterweight mixed martial artists
Living people